Roberto Petito (born 1 February 1971) is an Italian former professional road bicycle racer.

Petito was born in Civitavecchia.  His most important win came in 1997, when he won the Tirreno–Adriatico. He has also finished in  the top five in classics such as the Tour of Flanders or Paris–Roubaix, as well as the overall in the 2006 edition of the Four Days of Dunkirk.

Career achievements

Major results 

1992
 1st  Overall Giro delle Regioni
1st Stage 3
1994
 1st Giro della Romagna
 2nd Gran Piemonte
1995
 2nd Overall Tour Méditerranéen
 6th Overall Paris–Nice
1997
 1st  Overall Tirreno–Adriatico
 1st  Overall Giro di Sardegna
 1st  Overall Settimana Internazionale Coppi e Bartali
 7th Wincanton Classic
 7th Overall Tour of Galicia
 9th Overall Vuelta Ciclista a la Comunidad Valenciana
1998
 5th Trofeo Laigueglia
 8th La Flèche Wallonne
 9th Milan–San Remo
1999
 2nd Road race, National Road Championships
 7th Trofeo Melinda
2000
 2nd Trofeo Laigueglia
 9th Overall Tour Méditerranéen
2001
 1st Trofeo Pantalica
 6th Overall Tirreno–Adriatico
1st Stage 5 
 1st Stage 1 Giro d'Abruzzo
 4th Trofeo Laigueglia
 4th G.P. Costa degli Etruschi
 8th Overall Giro della Liguria
2003
 9th Trofeo Matteotti
 10th Overall Tour Méditerranéen
2004
 1st Stage 5 Tirreno–Adriatico
 5th Tre Valli Varesine
 7th Firenze–Pistoia
2005
 4th GP Lugano
 5th Tour of Flanders
 5th Overall Driedaagse van De Panne–Koksijde
 8th Milano–Torino
2006
 1st  Overall Four Days of Dunkirk
1st Stage 2
 6th Giro di Toscana
 10th Tour of Flanders
2007
 5th Paris–Roubaix

Grand Tour general classification results timeline

External links

1971 births
Living people
People from Civitavecchia
Italian male cyclists
Cyclists from Lazio
Sportspeople from the Metropolitan City of Rome Capital